Wardha–Yavatmal–Nanded line is an under-construction railway project based in Maharashtra, India. The railway line would facilitate the transport between Wardha to Nanded via Yavatmal. The Ministry of Railways, Government of India has given the project a "special project" status. The railway line would operate on a geographical area of 284 kilometers.

History

Land acquisition
The length of the line is 284 km and it needs 722 hectares of land. The Government of Maharashtra has approved the acquisition of 722 hectares of land. Around 90% of the land required for the Wardha–Yavatmal–Nanded broad-gauge railway line has been acquired and now Government of Maharashtra will request the Ministry of Railways to start the tender process.
 Land acquisition was completed in 2018.

Construction
Tender for all patches were granted in Feb 2019 and construction is already underway on several patches. 77 km Wardha–Yavatmal section was granted to the Construction Organisation of Central Railway zone, and 207 km Yavatmal–Nanded section was granted to Rail Vikas Nigam (RVNL). As of Feb 2019, earth works, all bridges (2 major bridges on Yashoda river and Bhindi River and 26 minor bridges), and at least 54 railway under bridge (RuB) have been completed. There will be six tunnels totalling 9.8 km, most challenging being a 2.5 km tunnel through a hillock behind Yavatmal Airport. Contracts for all station buildings have been awarded by Feb 2019 and construction has commenced.

Initial work on Yavatmal new railway station started. It will be constructed behind Z.P school Arni road Yavatmal.

Cost
Revised total project cost is of 284 km new line project is INR3168.29 crores. According to 2019–20 Pink Book, allocation for that financial year was INR350 crore, since the construction work is already underway and this should help complete a few sections faster.

Route
Following stations have been planned on the route (partial list, please help expand between Yavatmal to Nanded):
 , existing city station
 , town station
 , halt station
 , town station
 , halt station
 Yavatmal Junction, city station, narrow-gauge Shakuntala Railway use to run between Yavatmal old railway station and Achalpur in Amravati district and it is now planned to be converted to broad-gauge.
 , town station
 , city station
 city station
 , existing city station

Scope
The railway line would operate in six tehsils and 90 villages in Wardha, Yavatmal,  Washim, Hingoli and Nanded district of Maharashtra, India. When the line is commissioned it will provide direct connectivity between Nagpur and other districts in Vidarbha region and Marathwada region.
The Broad Guage Metro Will Also Run On This Route.

See also
 Indian Railways
 Rail transport in India

References

Proposed railway lines in India
Proposed infrastructure in Maharashtra
Rail transport in Maharashtra
Nagpur CR railway division
Nanded railway division
Transport in Nanded
Wardha district
Yavatmal district
5 ft 6 in gauge railways in India